Sectional density (often abbreviated SD) is the ratio of an object's mass to its cross sectional area with respect to a given axis.  It conveys how well an object's mass is distributed (by its shape) to overcome resistance along that axis.

Sectional density is used in gun ballistics.  In this context, it is the ratio of a projectile's weight (often in either kilograms, grams, pounds or grains) to its transverse section (often in either square centimeters, square millimeters or square inches), with respect to the axis of motion.  It conveys how well an object's mass is distributed (by its shape) to overcome resistance along that axis.  For illustration, a nail can penetrate a target medium with its pointed end first with less force than a coin of the same mass lying flat on the target medium.

During World War II, bunker-busting Röchling shells were developed by German engineer August Cönders, based on the theory of increasing sectional density to improve penetration.  Röchling shells were tested in 1942 and 1943 against the Belgian Fort d'Aubin-Neufchâteau and saw very limited use during World War II.

Formula 
In a general physics context, sectional density is defined as:

 SD is the sectional density
 M is the mass of the projectile
 A is the cross-sectional area

The SI derived unit for sectional density is kilograms per square meter (kg/m2). The general formula with units then becomes:

where:
 SDkg/m2 is the sectional density in kilograms per square meters
 mkg is the weight of the object in kilograms
 Am2 is the cross sectional area of the object in meters

Units conversion table 
 (Values in bold face are exact.)<noinclude>

 1 g/mm2 equals exactly  kg/m2.
 1 kg/cm2 equals exactly  kg/m2.
 1 lb/in2 = /(0.0254 m × 0.0254 m) ≈

Use in ballistics 

The sectional density of a projectile can be employed in two areas of ballistics.  Within external ballistics, when the sectional density of a projectile is divided by its coefficient of form (form factor in commercial small arms jargon); it yields the projectile's ballistic coefficient. Sectional density has the same (implied) units as the ballistic coefficient.

Within terminal ballistics, the sectional density of a projectile is one of the determining factors for projectile penetration. The interaction between projectile (fragments) and target media is however a complex subject. A study regarding hunting bullets shows that besides sectional density several other parameters determine bullet penetration.

If all other factors are equal, the projectile with the greatest amount of sectional density will penetrate the deepest.

Metric units 
When working with ballistics using SI units, it is common to use either grams per square millimeter or kilograms per square centimeter. Their relationship to the base unit kilograms per square meter is shown in the conversion table above.

Grams per square millimeter 
Using grams per square millimeter (g/mm2), the formula then becomes:

Where:
 SDg/mm2 is the sectional density in grams per square millimeters
 mg is the weight of the projectile in grams
 dmm is the diameter of the projectile in millimeters

For example, a small arms bullet weighing  and having a diameter of  has a sectional density of:
 10.4 g/(7.2 mm) = 0.200 g/mm2

Kilograms per square centimeter 
Using kilograms per square centimeter (kg/cm2), the formula then becomes:

Where:
 SDkg/cm2 is the sectional density in kilograms per square centimeter
 mg is the weight of the projectile in grams
 dcm is the diameter of the projectile in centimeters	

For example, an M107 projectile weighing 43.2 kg and having a body diameter of  has a sectional density of:
 43.2 kg/(15.471 mm) = 0.180 kg/cm2

English units 
In older ballistics literature from English speaking countries, and still to this day, the most commonly used unit for sectional density of circular cross-sections is (mass) pounds per square inch (lbm/in2) The formula then becomes:
 
where:
 SD is the sectional density in (mass) pounds per square inch
 the weight of the projectile is:
 Wlb in pounds
 Wgr in grains
 din is the diameter of the projectile in inches
	
The sectional density defined this way is usually presented without units.  
In Europe the derivative unit g/cm2 is also used in literature regarding small arms projectiles to get a number in front of the decimal separator.

 160 g/[7000 × (0.284 in)] = 0.283 lb/in2

As another example, the M107 projectile mentioned above weighing  and having a body diameter of  has a sectional density of:
 95.2 lb/( in) = 2.567 lbm/in2

See also 
 Ballistic coefficient

References

External links
 Sectional Density - A Practical Joke? By Gerard Schultz

Projectiles
Aerodynamics
Ballistics